Sagebrush and Silver is a 1941 American short documentary film. It was nominated for an Academy Award at the 14th Academy Awards for Best Short Subject (One-Reel).

References

External links
 

1941 films
1940s short documentary films
Black-and-white documentary films
1941 short films
American short documentary films
1941 documentary films
American black-and-white films
20th Century Fox short films
1940s English-language films
1940s American films